HMS Gosport was a 32-gun fifth rate built by William Collins of Shoreham in 1695/96. She spent her career on counter piracy patrols and trade protection duties in Home Waters, in North America and the West Indies. She was captured by the French in 1706.

She was the first vessel to bear the name Gosport in the English and Royal Navy.

Construction and Specifications
She was ordered on 3 May 1695 to be built under contract by William Collins of Shorehame. She was launched on 3 September 1696. Her builder's measure tonnage was calculated as 384 tons (burthen).

The gun armament initially was four demi-culverins on the lower deck (LD) with two pair of guns per side. The upper deck (UD) battery would consist of between twenty and twenty-two 6-pounder guns with ten or eleven guns per side. The gun battery would be completed by four 4-pounder guns on the quarterdeck (QD) with two to three guns per side.

Commissioned Service
HMS Gosport was commissioned in 1696 under the command of Captain David Greenhill for service with Captain George Mee's Squadron sent to the West Indies to reinforce Vice-Admiral John Neville. After countering the French and with the Spanish policy of non-cooperation with the English, the squadron returned to Home Waters in late 1697 under Captain Thomas Dilkes, as both Admiral Neville and Captain Mee had died. In 1701 she was under Captain Henry Crofts until his death on 16 December 1702. In 1703 she was under Lieutenant Thomas Crofts (acting Commander) and sailed to New England. In 1704 she was assigned Captain Thomas Smith as Commander while in New England and then returned Home. Captain John Barter was assigned commander until his suspension in 1706. Under Captain Barter she was assigned to service in the English Channel and the Bay of Biscay. Captain Edward St Loe replaced Captain Barter in 1706 and sailed for the West Indies.

Los
While in transit to Jamaica, on the 28th of July 1706 she was taken by the 54-gun Le Jason losing 20 killed with 40 wounded.

Notes

Citations

References

 Winfield (2009), British Warships in the Age of Sail (1603 – 1714), by Rif Winfield, published by Seaforth Publishing, England © 2009, EPUB 
 Colledge (2020), Ships of the Royal Navy, by J.J. Colledge, revised and updated by Lt Cdr Ben Warlow and Steve Bush, published by Seaforth Publishing, Barnsley, Great Britain, © 2020, EPUB 
 Lavery (1989), The Arming and Fitting of English Ships of War 1600 - 1815, by Brian Lavery, published by US Naval Institute Press © Brian Lavery 1989, Part V Guns, Type of Guns
 Clowes (1898), The Royal Navy, A History from the Earliest Times to the Present (Vol. II). London. England: Sampson Low, Marston & Company, © 1898

 

Frigates of the Royal Navy
Ships of the Royal Navy
1690s ships